Steffan Evans (born 1 September 1994) is a Welsh rugby union player who plays for Scarlets regional team as a fullback and winger, although he has played at centre for Llanelli too. He studied in Ysgol Gyfun y Strade, he is a fluent Welsh speaker.

Evans made his debut for the Scarlets regional team in 2014 having previously played for the Scarlets academy.

Evans finished as the 2016-2017 Pro12 season's highest try scorer with 11 tries.

International
Evans made his only appearance for the Wales U20s in a 10-16 defeat to France in 2014

After impressive form in the first half of the 2016-17 season, Evans earned a call-up to the Welsh squad for the 2017 Six Nations. In May 2017 he was named in the Wales senior squad for the tests against Tonga and Samoa in June 2017

During Wales' summer tour Evans scored two tries against Samoa.

International tries

References

External links 
Scarlets Player Profile

Welsh rugby union players
Wales international rugby union players
Scarlets players
Living people
Rugby union players from Llanelli
1994 births
Rugby union wings